Laus may refer to:

 Laüs, an ancient city on the west coast of Lucania
 Laus River, a river of southern Italy
 Paul Laus (born 1970), former professional ice hockey player
 Beatrice Kristi Laus (born 2000), Filipino-British singer-songwriter and guitarist
 Our Lady of Laus, the first Marian apparition approved in the 21st century by the Catholic Church
 Saint-Étienne-le-Laus, an administrative division in the Hautes-Alpes department in southeastern France
 Notre-Dame-du-Laus, Quebec, a municipality in Canada

See also

 LAUS (Los Angeles Union Station)